The Rev James Frederic Mozley (23 December 1887 – 8 July 1974) was a British historian and Anglican priest.

He was educated at Exeter College, Oxford, where he studied the Literae humaniores and graduated with a BA in 1910. He trained as an Anglican priest at Lichfield Theological College and was ordained in 1913. In 1937 he published a biography of the Bible translator William Tyndale, in 1940 a study of John Foxe's Book of Martyrs and in 1953 a work on Miles Coverdale's translation of the Bible. The Bible scholar Jack P. Lewis said Mozley's work "furnished excellent treatments of the Bibles of Coverdale and Tyndale".

Works
William Tyndale (London: Society for Promoting Christian Knowledge, 1937).
John Foxe and His Book (London: Society for Promoting Christian Knowledge, 1940).
Coverdale and His Bibles (Lutterworth Press, 1953).

Notes

1887 births
1974 deaths
Alumni of Exeter College, Oxford
20th-century Anglican priests